Mariani Junction railway station is the major railway junction of Jorhat district in the Indian state of Assam on the Lumding–Dibrugarh section. It serves Jorhat city, Mariani and its surrounding area as well.
New Construction: EMD Diesel Locomotive Shed for 50 locomotives.
Zonal Number (for its Trains) = 159XX

Amenities
Mariani junction has three platforms, two double-bedded retiring rooms, computerized railway reservation system, parking facilities, vegetarian food stalls and free high speed Google RailWire WiFi.

Mariani diesel locomotive shed
NFR's upcoming second fully-fledged state of art dedicated EMD locomotive shed.
With an aim to further upgrade the maintenance of diesel locomotives in the North Eastern region and to ease the pressure faced by the New Guwahati Diesel Locomotive Shed, the Indian Railways is now coming up with two more such sheds in Assam, which will be located at Mariani. A diesel locomotive shed is being constructed after being removed out of Railway Quarters and used to handle 50 EMD WDP4Ds & WDG4Ds Dual Cab locomotives, which have a range of 4,500 horsepower.
There will be around 500 personnel, including engineers and artisans, in both the upcoming sheds.
Afterwards, Tinsukia Division will have its own locomotive shed, as presently it has trip sheds.
After that, Northeast Frontier Railway will get its fourth locomotive shed, the second locomotive shed in Assam after the New Guwahati shed, to ease pressure on Malda Town locomotive shed, Siliguri socomotive shed, and New Guwahati locomotive shed. The expected completion and commission is March 2018.

Major trains
 New Delhi–Dibrugarh Rajdhani Express (Via New Tinsukia)
 New Delhi–Dibrugarh Rajdhani Express (Via Moranhat)
Guwahati–Dibrugarh Shatabdi Express
Dibrugarh–Kanyakumari Vivek Express
Dibrugarh–Amritsar Express
Dibrugarh–Chandigarh Express
New Tinsukia–Bengaluru Weekly Express
Dibrugarh-Lalgarh Avadh Assam Express
Dibrugarh - Lokmanya Tilak Terminus Superfast Express
Dibrugarh-Howrah Kamrup Express via Guwahati
New Tinsukia–Rajendra Nagar Weekly Express
Guwahati–Jorhat Town Jan Shatabdi Express
Guwahati - Dibrugarh Town Nagaland Express
Guwahati–Silchar Express
Guwahati - Mariani BG Express
New Tinsukia - Darbhanga Jivachh Link Express
Alipurduar–Lumding Intercity Express
Guwahati–Ledo Intercity Express
Rangiya–New Tinsukia Express
Silchar - New Tinsukia Barak Brahmaputra Express

References

External links
 

Railway junction stations in Assam
Railway stations in Jorhat district
Tinsukia railway division